Danny de Graaf (born 30 March 1988, in Amsterdam), who performs under the stage name David Gravell, is a Dutch DJ and trance record producer. He was voted for several IDMA's in 2015.

David Gravell first gained recognition in 2013 for his original "Bulldozer", released on W&W's label Mainstage Music. He is signed exclusively to Armada.

Musical career
David Gravell's first ever release was his track "Downtown" on Visionair Records in 2010. After signing "Flight 182" on Marcel Woods' label Musical Madness he then released "Fire Away" which was included on W&W's Mainstage Vol. 1 compilation. His next release, "Bulldozer", was heavily supported by his peers in the industry, including Armin van Buuren on his BBC Radio 1 Essential Mix.

Between 2013 and 2015, he had well-received releases such as "Bulldozer", "Megatron', "Timebomb", "The Last Of Us" and "Supernova". These songs were supported by successful artists including Armin van Buuren, Hardwell, W&W, and Andrew Rayel. Next to that, he produced official remixes for the likes of Armin van Buuren, Dash Berlin, Ørjan Nilsen, and Mark Sixma. 
Within six months, his remix for Dash Berlin's 'Man On The Run' reached over 1 million plays on Spotify.

Meanwhile, Gravell has played at four A State Of Trance Festivals in Sydney, Ibiza and Utrecht. He has also performed at other festivals such as Ultra Music Festival, Creamfields, Amsterdam Dance Event, and Boulevard Outdoor.

Discography

Singles 
 2012
 "Flight 182" [Musical Madness] 
 "Fire Away" [Mainstage Music] 
 2013
 "Bulldozer" [Mainstage Music]
 "Megatron" [6K Music] 
 2014
 "Nighthawk" [Armada Trice]
 "Melbourne" [Armada Captivating] 
 "Timebomb" [A State Of Trance]
 "The Last Of Us" [Armada Captivating]
 "Supernova" [Mainstage Music] 
 "Kaiju"[Armada Captivating] 
 2015
 "It's In Your Heart" (feat. Christon) [Armada Captivating]
 "Valor" (with Husman) [Armada Captivating]
 "I Follow" [A State Of Trance]
 2016
 "Far From Home" (feat. Ruby Prophet) [Armada Captivating]
 "Stay Awake" [A State Of Trance]
 "The Riddle" [Armada Captivating]
 "Battlefront" [A State Of Trance]
 "Make Some Noise" [A State Of Trance]
 '"The Road" [A State Of Trance]
 "Neverland" [A State Of Trance]
 2017
 "Energy" [A State Of Trance/Armada]
 "Explore" [A State Of Trance/Armada]
 "Children" [A State Of Trance/Armada] (Cover by Robert Miles)
 "Traveller" [A State Of Trance/Armada]
 "On The Move" [inHarmony Music/Armada]
 "Addicted To" [Mainstage Music]
2018
 "Trance ReBorn" (with Andrew Rayel) [inHarmony Music]
 "The Future" [A State Of Trance/Armada]
2019
 "Never Sleep" (with Blastoyz) [Alteza Records]
 "Alpha Centauri" (with KhoMha) [Armind]

Remixes 
 2013
 Audien feat Michael S. - "Leaving You" (David Gravell Remix) [Zouk Recordings]
 2014
 Mark Sixma & Jerome Isma-ae - "Refused" (David Gravell Remix) [Jee Productions]
 Veracocha - "Carte Blanche" (David Gravell Remix) [Deal Records]
 2015
 Armin van Buuren - "Together (In A State Of Trance)" (David Gravell Remix) [A State Of Trance]
 Alexander Popov - "Lost Language'" (David Gravell Remix) [Armind]
 Dash Berlin, Cerf, Mitiska & Jaren - "Man On The Run" (David Gravell Remix) [Armada Captivating]
 Tigerlily - "Feel The Love" (David Gravell Remix) [Universal Music]
 Ørjan Nilsen - "Amsterdam" (David Gravell Remix) [In My Opinion]
 2016
 Super8 & Tab - "Komorebi" (David Gravell Remix) [Armind]
 ilan Bluestone feat. Giuseppe De Luca - "Bigger Than Love" (David Gravell Remix) [Anjunabeats]
 Eurythmics - "Sweet Dreams (Are Made of This)" (David Gravell Remix) [Free Download]
2017
 Armin van Buuren - "Communication" (David Gravell Remix) [Armind]
 Yeah Yeah Yeahs - "Heads Will Roll" (David Gravell Remix)
2018
 Energy 52 - Café del Mar (David Gravell Remix)

Reworks 
 2015
 Sebastian Ingrosso & Tommy Trash ft. John Martin - "Reload" (David Gravell Rework)
 2016
 Calvin Harris & Disciples - "How Deep Is Your Love" (David Gravell Rework)

References

External links
 

1988 births
Living people
Dutch DJs
Remixers
Dutch dance musicians
Musicians from Amsterdam